Melicope subunifoliolata is a plant of Borneo in the family Rutaceae. The specific epithet  is from the Latin meaning "nearly one leaf", referring to the almost unifoliolate leaves.

Description
The branchlets are hairy to velvety when young.

Distribution and habitat
Melicope subunifoliolata is endemic to Borneo where it is confined to Sabah.

References

subunifoliolata
Endemic flora of Borneo
Flora of Sabah
Plants described in 1994
Taxonomy articles created by Polbot